Yi Myeong-gi(이명기, b.?~d.?) was a courtesy painter of Joseon.  He was a full-time painter during the 18th century, of which records can be found: Yi was named as the courtesy painter in 1791. He was one of the most famed portrait painters during Jeongjo era circa late 18th century. Although he was renowned for the portraits, Shan shui paintings heavily dealt with Kim Hong-do's characteristics in terms of shaping rocks, figures and calligraphy.

Several paintings are found in National Museum of Korea and Hoam Art Museum, one of the oldest private museums in Seoul.

Galleries

See also
Gim Hongdo
List of Korean painters
Korean painting
Korean art

References  

Year of birth unknown
Year of death unknown
Landscape painters
18th-century Korean painters